Björgvin Franz Gíslason (born 9 December 1977) is an Icelandic actor, entertainer and children's television host.

Early life 
Björgvin  was born in Reykjavík, Iceland in 1977 to parents, actors Edda Björgvinsdóttir and Gísli Rúnar Jónsson.

Career 
In the late 2000s, Björgvin got the job as the children's presenter at Stundin okkar. Stundin okkar (English: Our moment) is one of the longest-running television programs in Icelandic television history. It has run at 6 PM on RÚV Sunday nights every year since Christmas 1966. In addition to hosting the show, Björgvin also published adventure books for children with themes related to the children's show. Björgvin wrote the first episodes with his mother Edda and said it was the most fun job in the world, but in 2011 he felt that it was his time to pass the torch. By that time Björgvin  had won an Edda award for best children's television program.

He quit his job as TV-presenter in 2011 to move to America where his wife was studying in Wisconsin.

In 2010, he co-starred in Buddy Holly: the musical alongside 3 other actors former Stundin Okkar hosts: Gunnar Helgason, Felix Bergsson and Jóhann G. Jóhannson.

In 2016, he co-starred in his mother's one-woman show Eddan, as the long-lost son just returned from America. The show was based on his mother's life and career.

In 2022, he appeared as Hemmi Gunn in the Icelandic mini-series Blackport.

Personal life 
Björgvin is married to Berglind Ólafsdóttir, a marriage counselor. They started dating in 2000 and got married in 2009. They have two daughters. 

Björgvin has been a fan of The Doors since he was 13 years old and fronted a tribute band at the group's event in Reykjavík in 2004.

Filmography

See also 

 List of Icelandic writers

References

External links 
 

1977 births
Bjorgvin Franz Gíslason
Bjorgvin Franz Gíslason
Bjorgvin Franz Gíslason
Bjorgvin Franz Gíslason
Bjorgvin Franz Gíslason
Living people
Male television personalities
Bjorgvin Franz Gíslason
Bjorgvin Franz Gíslason